Christopher Hyatt (12 July 1943 – 9 February 2008), born Alan Ronald Miller, was an American psychologist, occultist, and author. He is perhaps best known as president of New Falcon Publications, an independent publisher specializing in of psychedelic and occult literature; Hyatt's press published work by several well-known champions of consciousness expansion, including Israel Regardie, Timothy Leary, Robert Anton Wilson, and Antero Alli.

Early life
A native of Chicago, Alan Miller, the son of police lieutenant Leonard Miller and his wife, Bertha Freidman, was born during what he described as the "roaring war years". Writing and speaking as Christopher Hyatt, Miller claimed to have dropped out of high school at the age of sixteen, working instead as a dishwasher and cook, roaming the United States. Miller's obituary states he left high school at 17 and joined the U.S.Navy.

Academic career
Alan Miller was trained in experimental and clinical psychology and practiced as a psychotherapist.  The 18 units earned from his military GED towards his first academic career were used at Los Angeles City College, where he studied accounting for two years.  He later changed his graduate to General Psychology, earning master's degrees in experimental psychology and medical education and Counseling.  He was a member of a Freudian clinic in Southern California.  He spent almost a year studying hypnosis at the Hypnosis Motivation Institute in Los Angeles and also studied hypnosis at the University of California, Irvine. Miller possessed Ph.D.s in both clinical psychology and human behavior and was a Postdoctoral researcher in Criminal Justice.  Some of his techniques blended Reichian physiotherapy and tantric yoga. He also incorporated hypnosis alongside his bodywork with patients and students. In the late 1960s and early 1970s, Alan R. Miller's research was published in various peer-reviewed articles and professional journals.

According to the Original Falcon Press website: "He fled academia and state sponsored psychology to become an explorer of the human mind."

Occultism
Miller's interest in the occult began in his early twenties.  His desire to further pursue his studies in magick resulted in meeting Israel Regardie in Studio City in the 1970s.  Regardie introduced Miller to Reichian therapy, which he insisted Miller learn prior to any magical pursuits. Regardie further instructed Miller in the magical system of the Hermetic Order of the Golden Dawn.  In 1987 Lon Milo DuQuette, an occultist who would eventually become  O.T.O.'s United States Deputy Grand Master, initiated Hyatt into the Newport Beach lodge of the Ordo Templi Orientis, with Hyatt eventually becoming a Ninth Degree member of the occult Order.  Hyatt later co-founded (with David Cherubim) the Thelemic Order of the Golden Dawn in Los Angeles on the Vernal Equinox of 1990.

New Falcon Press
Miller formed Falcon Press in 1980 and, adopting the pseudonym Christopher S. Hyatt, began publishing out of his Sedona, Arizona home.

Death
Hyatt died of cancer in Scottsdale, Arizona at the age of 64.

Works
 Sex Magic, Tantra & Tarot: The Way of the Secret Lover, with Don Milo Duquette. (1991).  New Falcon Publications; 2nd edition.  
 Energized Hypnosis: A Non-Book for Self Change, with Calvin Iwema.  (2005).  New Falcon Publications.  
 Aleister Crowley's Illustrated Goetia: Sexual Evocation, with Lon Milo DuQuette and David P. Wilson. (2005).  New Falcon Publications.
 A Modern Shaman's Guide to a Pregnant Universe, with Antero Alli. (2008). The Original Falcon Press; UK edition. 
 Taboo: Sex, Religion & Magick, with Don Milo DuQuette.  (2008). The Original Falcon Press.  
 Secrets of Western Tantra: The Sexuality of the Middle Path. (2009). New Falcon Publications; 3rd edition. 
 Undoing Yourself with Energized Meditation and Other Devices. (2010). New Falcon Publications; 5th revised edition. 
 Pacts with the Devil: A Chronicle of Sex, Blasphemy & Liberation, with S. Jason Black. (2010). The Original Falcon Press. 
 The Psychopath's Notebook, with S. Jason Black.  (2008).  New Falcon Publications.   
 The Psychopath's Bible: For the Extreme Individual, edited by Nicholas Tharcher (2011). The Original Falcon Press; 2nd edition. 
 Urban Voodoo: A Beginners Guide to Afro-Caribbean Magic, with S. Jason Black. (2011). New Falcon Publications; 1st edition. 
 The Big Black Book: Become Who You Are, with S. Jason Black, Joseph Matheny, Nicholas Archer et al. (2020).  The Original Falcon Press.

About
Lucifer's Rebellion: A Tribute to Christopher S. Hyatt, edited with a foreword by Shelley Marmor. (2011). New Falcon Publications.

Notes and references

External links
 Tribute site to Christopher Hyatt by New Falcon Publications 
 The Original Falcon Press
 New Falcon Publications
 

1943 births
2008 deaths
American hypnotists
American occult writers
20th-century American psychologists
American psychotherapists
Ceremonial magicians
Los Angeles City College alumni
Members of Ordo Templi Orientis
Writers from Chicago
Deaths from cancer in Arizona